Errol John Draper (born 27 September 1934) is a former South African cricketer who played first-class cricket from 1951 to 1968.

At 17 Errol Draper followed his elder brother Ron into the Eastern Province team in the 1951–52 season, taking 6 for 114 in the first innings of his debut Currie Cup match. He played only once more for Eastern Province before following Ron to Griqualand West, where he played as a middle-order batsman and occasional left-arm spinner. His best seasons were 1954–55 (407 runs at an average of 37.00) and 1955–56 (435 at 39.54), but he remained a regular member of the team until 1967–68, when he made his highest score, 118 against Orange Free State, his third century against Orange Free State in his final first-class match. He captained Griqualand West in the Currie Cup in 1959–60 and from 1962–63 to 1967–68.

References

External links
 Errol Draper at Cricinfo

1934 births
Living people
Cricketers from Port Elizabeth
South African cricketers
Eastern Province cricketers
Griqualand West cricketers